Jelendol (or Hirisgruben, Gottscheerish: Hirisgruəbn) is a settlement south of Rakitnica in the Municipality of Ribnica in southern Slovenia. The area is part of the traditional region of Lower Carniola and is now included in the Southeast Slovenia Statistical Region.

Name
According to Snoj, names like Jêlendol, pronounced /ɛː/, are ultimately derived from the Slovene common noun jelen 'red deer', meaning 'deer hollow, deer valley', but names like Jélendol, pronounced /eː/, are instead derived from *Jélin dôl, literally 'fir hollow, fir valley' from the Slovene common noun jela 'fir'. This toponym is one of the latter. The German name Hirschgruben and the Gottscheerish name Hirisgruəbn mean 'deer hollow' (cf. German Hirsch 'deer', Gottscheerish hiris 'deer').

History
Jelendol was a Gottschee German settlement. North of the village, on the slope of Strmec Hill, are the remnants of an unfinished castle that the Auersperg noble family had started building. The Auerspergs drew water from Cave Spring to supply a steam-powered sawmill in the village. Jelendol was an industrial settlement in the middle of a fir and beech forest. The sawmill had a production capacity of 700 wagons of lumber per year, which was exported to Italy, Spain, and Africa. Before the Second World War, the village had three houses and a population of 48. The original residents were evicted from the area in 1941 during the Second World War and the sawmill was burned. After the war, the site consisted of two large buildings surrounded by coniferous forest. The village no longer has any permanent residents, and the buildings are occasionally used by forestry workers.

Mass grave
Jelendol is the site of a mass grave from the Second World War. It contained the remains of 119 anticommunist militia prisoners of war from the prison in Ribnica that were shot by the communist Security and Intelligence Service (VOS) in October 1943. Most of the victims were reburied at the military cemetery in Hrovača on 4 October 1944.

References

External links
Jelendol on Geopedia
Pre–World War II map of Jelendol with oeconyms and family names

Populated places in the Municipality of Ribnica